Dilute Russell's viper venom time (dRVVT) is a laboratory test often used for detection of lupus anticoagulant (LA).

History 
Russell's viper venom (RVV) was known to clot blood many years ago. It was widely used as a styptic to clot minor wounds when razor blades were more commonly used for shaving (e.g. “Stypven”, Burroughs-Wellcome Pharma). RVV came to be useful in laboratory tests for blood clotting factors V, X, prothrombin and phospholipid.

It was first used in clotting tests for lupus anticoagulant (LA) in an individual case in 1975. The “dilute Russells Viper Venom time (dRVVT)” test was then applied in 1985 to diagnose LA in a large number of patients and it became more widely used for this purpose. This multi-step method involved adding individual solutions of dilute phospholipid, RVV and calcium chloride to a test plasma and then measuring how long it took for the mixture to clot. 

In 1989, researchers at Westmead Hospital developed a simpler assay by combining the venom, phospholipid, and calcium into a single reagent. Its first use on LA patients was reported in 1990. It was commercialized as “LA Screen” by Gradipore Ltd, Sydney (later Life Diagnostics) and distributed widely by American Diagnostica Inc (New York) as “dVVTest”.

The reagent was improved in 1992 by making it resistant to the widely used interfering anticoagulant heparin. Also a new LA resistant version with increased phospholipid was released at that time. This was introduced as “LA-Confirm” by Gradipore and “dVVConfirm” by American Diagnostica. Results with this high phospholipid reagent were not prolonged by most LA but remained similarly affected as in the "screen" test by all other variables in test plasmas (Gradipore product information). The combination of screening and confirmatory dRVVT reagents made identification of LA more simple. Manufacture of these reagents has since passed on to the major diagnostic companies such as Diagnostica Stago, Precision Biologic, and IL/Werfen.

Mechanism
This in vitro diagnostic test is based on the ability of the venom of the Russelli viper to accelerate blood clotting. The venom contains the enzymes RVV-V and RVV-X which activate factor V and factor X, which converts prothrombin into thrombin in the presence of phospholipid and calcium.

In the dRVVT assay, low, rate-limiting concentrations of both Russell's viper venom and phospholipid are used to give a standard clotting time of 30 to 40 seconds. This makes the test sensitive to the presence of lupus anticoagulants, because these antibodies interfere with the clot-promoting role of phospholipid in vitro, and their presence results in a prolonged clotting time. A mixing study is then performed, which consists of adding an equal volume of the patient's plasma to normal plasma; in this study, one would expect the clotting time to be significantly shortened if there was only a deficiency of coagulation factors alone. A prolonged clotting time beyond a 3SD (or 95th percentile) cutoff that does not correct despite the mixing study suggests the presence of a lupus anticoagulant.

An abnormal result for the initial dRVVT assay should be followed by a dRVVT confirmatory test. In this test, the inhibitory effect of lupus anticoagulants on phospholipids in the dRVVT can be overcome by adding an excess of phospholipid to the assay. The clotting times of both the initial dRVVT assay and confirmatory test are normalized and then used to determine a ratio of time without phospholipid excess to time with phospholipid excess. In general, a ratio of greater than 1.3 is considered a positive result and implies that the patient may have antiphospholipid antibodies. The dRVVT test has a higher specificity than the aPTT test for the detection of lupus anticoagulant, because it is not influenced by deficiencies or inhibitors of clotting factors VIII, IX or XI as the venom mainly activates only factors V and X.

However dRVVT tests are strongly affected by the new direct oral anticoagulants (DOACs) and false positive LA results are obtained particularly with rivaroxaban. It is now possible to specifically remove DOACs from test plasmas with activated carbon and enable the correct diagnosis of LA with the dRVVT system despite their initial presence.

Use in diagnosis
The dRVVT is one component of a workup of a suspected antiphospholipid antibody, the other component being the serological testing for anticardiolipin antibodies and anti-β2 glycoprotein-I antibodies using ELISA technology.  The Sapporo criteria require at least one of the above laboratory tests to be positive and the patient to have at least one clinical manifestation of antiphospholipid syndrome, such as vascular thrombosis or fetal mortality/morbidity, in order to diagnose the antiphospholipid syndrome. Positive laboratory test results should be seen on two occasions at least 12 weeks apart in order for diagnosis.  Antiphospholipid antibody syndrome is an important marker for recurrent thrombosis, and often warrants indefinite anticoagulant (blood thinner) therapy. Warfarin appears to be preferable to DOACs as the latter have recently been found less effective than expected.

The criteria were defined in 1999, and revised in 2006.

References

Blood tests